Devil's Water is a river in Northumberland, England.

Its tributaries include the Rowley Burn and West Dipton Burn.

Devil's Water is of historical interest, figuring in the Battle of Hexham.

Etymology
The name Devil's Water may share an etymology with the various rivers named Douglas in Northern England and Scotland such as the Douglas Water and River Douglas. The name is derived from the Brittonic elements dūβ-, meaning "black", and *glẹ:ss, "stream, rivulet, watercourse" (Welsh du-glais).

References

Rivers of Northumberland
History of Northumberland
1DevilsWater